Hybridoneura abnormis is a moth in the family Geometridae. It is found in the north-eastern Himalayas, Sri Lanka, Sundaland and on Sulawesi. The habitat consists of mixed dipterocarp forests, as well as lower montane forests.

This species has a wingspan of 24mm.

References

Moths described in 1898
Eupitheciini